Williamson's mouse-deer (Tragulus williamsoni) is a species of even-toed ungulate in the family Tragulidae. It is found in Thailand, and possibly in China. The species is named after the collector Walter James Franklin Williamson.

References 

Tragulus
Mammals described in 1916